Said Qomi (سعید قمی, 1639–1691) was an Iranian Shia philosopher of Qom's School.

Life
When Qazi was young, completed his preliminary education in Qom. Since that he worked as judge in Qom he known as Qazi Said. His father taught him medicine and philosophy. He criticized the substantial motion, a theory by Mulla Sadra.

In Isfahan he was the pupil of Rajab Ali Tabrizi, Muhsen Feyz and Abd al-Razzaq Lahiji. Thus, after the Persian treatise Kalid-i bihisht (The Key of Paradise), where he takes up the theory of the equivocalness of being professed by his teacher Rajab Ali, he started to write an extremely complex Commentary on Forty Hadith, but he does not get beyond the twenty-eighth.

Finally, he wrote a commentary on al-Tawhid by al-Shaykh al-Saduq.

Death
Qazi  spent his last years in Alamaut, with an appointment to a high position in Qom. He finally died on 18 of Ramazan in 1691.

Notes

References

Further reading
 Aavani, N. (2022). Qāḍī Saʿīd Qummī. In The Encyclopedia of Philosophy of Religion (eds C. Taliaferro and S. Goetz). https://doi.org/10.1002/9781119009924.eopr0321

Islamic philosophers
Iranian Shia scholars of Islam
People from Qom
1692 deaths
1633 births
17th-century Iranian philosophers
17th-century Muslim scholars of Islam
Iranian Muslim mystics
17th-century writers of Safavid Iran